Bernice Adiku Heloo (born September 24, 1954) is a Ghanaian politician and was the former Member of Parliament for Hohoe Constituency.

Early life 
Heloo was born in Hohoe, Volta Region, to Rev. E. T. Adiku and Comfort Adiku.

Education 
Heloo attended Mawuli School and OLA Girls' Secondary School, Ho. She obtained a BA in study of religions and an MPhil in adult education from the University of Ghana. She also obtained an M.Ed. in adult education, literacy for rural development from the University of Manchester. She obtained her doctorate degree in political economy from the Swiss Management Center University.

Career 
Heloo was the immediate past president of Society For Women and AIDS in Africa and founder of Prolink, an NGO in Ghana. She is currently the member of Parliament for Hohoe constituency.

Politics

Member of Parliament 
Heloo was a minority member in the 6th parliament of the 4th republic of Ghana. She was the member of parliament for Hohoe, Volta Region from January 7, 2013, to date; this is her second term.
As the parliamentary member for Hohoe Constituency, Heloo criticized the president of the Republic of Ghana Nana Addo Dankwa Akufo-Addo for not addressing the kidnapping of the Takoradi girls in the 2019 state of the nation address.

Deputy Minister 
She was appointed by John Dramani Mahama in 2013 to serve as deputy Minister of Environment, Science and Technology and Innovation. She served in that role in the John Mahama administration from 2013 to 2017.

Personal life 
Heloo is a Christian and is married.

References 

Living people
1966 births
University of Ghana alumni
Alumni of the University of Manchester
Mawuli School alumni
Women members of the Parliament of Ghana
Ghanaian MPs 2013–2017
Ghanaian MPs 2017–2021
OLA Girls Senior High School (Ho) alumni
21st-century Ghanaian women politicians